Library station could refer to:

 Library station (Pittsburgh), a light rail station in Pittsburgh, Pennsylvania
 Library station (UTA), a light rail station in Salt Lake City, Utah
 Shanghai Library station, a subway station in Shanghai, China
 Silver Spring Library station, a light rail station in Silver Spring, Maryland
 Harold Washington Library – State/Van Buren station, an elevated station in Chicago, Illinois